A fire ring is a construction or device used to contain campfires and prevent them from spreading and turning into wildfires.

A fire ring is designed to contain a fire that is built directly upon the ground, such as a campfire. Fire rings have no bottom, and are simply circles made of forged metal, stones, concrete, etc. which surround and contain a fire. Manufactured steel fire rings are available in various sizes to suit every need.

When a fire is to be built somewhere such as on a patio or in a backyard, a fire pit or outdoor fireplace may be better used instead. These are designed to contain the entire fire instead of just keeping it in one place.

A fire ring may be nothing more than a short, wide section of metal tube, partially buried in the ground.  Slightly more advanced fire rings may be partially covered with metal bars so that the fire may be used for cooking. These types are seen at many campgrounds.  Fire rings in urban areas, such as on beaches, may be made of poured concrete. Makeshift fire rings can be constructed out of a ring of stones where pre-constructed rings are not available, but care should be taken as some stones can explode when heated due to trapped gas pockets, thermal expansion, or water contained flashing into steam.

See also 
 Fire pit

Fireplaces